The Council for the Ongoing Government of Tokelau is the executive body in Tokelau.  It serves as the governing organization for Tokelau when the General Fono is not in session. The council has six members, consisting of the faipule (leader) and pulenuku (village mayor) of each of the three atolls, Fakaofo, Nukunonu, and Atafu. It was established in November 2003, replacing the Council of Faipule, which had been established in 1993 and had three members – the three faipule.

Current council

The 11th Government comprises:

Past governments
10th Government (2020-2022)

9th Government (2017-2019)

8th Government (2014-2016)

7th Government (2011-2013)

6th Government (2008-2010)

5th Government (2005-2007)

4th Government (2002-2004)

See also
 2020 Tokelauan general election

Notes

References 

Politics of Tokelau
Tokelau
Government of Tokelau
Political organisations based in Tokelau